Jeotgalicoccus aerolatus is a species of bacteria in the family Staphylococcaceae. A strain of this species was originally isolated from the air on a turkey farm and is closely related to Jeotgalicoccus halotolerans.

References

External links
Type strain of Jeotgalicoccus aerolatus at BacDive -  the Bacterial Diversity Metadatabase

aerolatus
Bacteria described in 2011